Río Hondo is a corregimiento in Las Tablas District, Los Santos Province, Panama with a population of 206 as of 2010. Its population as of 1990 was 299; its population as of 2000 was 254.

References

Corregimientos of Los Santos Province